The Raccoons is a Canadian animated television series that ran on CBC from November 11, 1985 to March 19, 1991 in Canada and on Disney Channel from July 4, 1985 to August 28, 1992 in the U.S., with three preceding television specials from its inception in 1980, and one direct-to-video special in 1984. The franchise was created by Kevin Gillis with the co-operation of the Canadian Broadcasting Corporation.

Synopsis
The series revolves around Bert Raccoon and married couple Ralph and Melissa Raccoon, of whom Bert is a friend and roommate. The series mostly involved the trio's efforts against the industrialist forces of greedy aardvark millionaire Cyril Sneer, who regularly tries to destroy the forest for personal wealth. However, the Raccoons always save their forest from Cyril's schemes, with help from their forest friends including Schaeffer, a gentle Old English Sheepdog; Cedric, Cyril's college graduate son; and Sophia Tutu, Cedric's girlfriend. As the series progresses, Cyril becomes more of a sympathetic character, eventually becoming an antihero, becoming more responsible in his priorities and business practices.

Originally, the story was set in a kind of hidden world in the Evergreen Forest where a small human family of a forest ranger and his children reside unaware of the struggles taking place out of sight. The second season had these human characters removed as the premise shifted to an unambiguous fantasy world of a sophisticated humanoid animal version of Canada with complex transportation systems, broadcasting media and heavy industry etc. In addition, Ralph's relatives become regular characters, especially his young nephew and niece, Bentley the insecure child technology prodigy and Lisa the statuesque athletic teenager who became an understated love interest for Bert.

Unlike many other cartoons of its time, it handled action, humour, and romance in a fairly sophisticated manner, while remaining sufficiently uncomplicated for younger viewers. Lessons featured in the series mainly focused on environmentalism. It also covered other topics, including friendship and teamwork.

Episodes

Characters

Main
 Bert Raccoon (voiced by Len Carlson) - the main protagonist of the series. He is Ralph and Melissa's houseguest and is their best friend from childhood. An energetic raccoon with a lot of imagination, Bert always likes to seek out adventure and to live life to the fullest. Although he is impulsive and prone to foolish decisions, he has a kind heart.
 Ralph Raccoon (voiced by Bob Dermer) and Melissa Raccoon (voiced by Rita Coolidge (specials 1–2), Dottie West (special 3), Linda Feige (season 1) and Susan Roman (seasons 2–5)) – the happily married couple who live in the "Raccoondominium" with their more-or-less permanent houseguest Bert. Ralph tolerates Bert's antics to some extent and knows his heart is in the right place but it doesn't prevent him from getting frustrated by them, he is also the founder of "The Evergreen Standard" newspaper. Melissa is the more sensible of the three raccoons, and is always there to give the boys a push in the right direction, she often enjoys a good laugh too, usually when Bert or Ralph act silly or when Cyril's plans go embarrassingly awry.
 Cedric Sidney Sneer (voiced by Fred Little (specials 1-3) and Marvin Goldhar (series)) – Cyril Sneer's nerdy son and Bert Raccoon's best friend, and heir to the Sneer fortune. Since the special "The Raccoons on Ice" Cedric has gained a crush on Sophia and usually acts nervous around her. In the specials he was completely passive and subservient to his father, but gradually becomes more assertive as the series goes on.
 Schaeffer (voiced by Carl Banas) – a large sheepdog, who is friends with the Raccoons. Originally portrayed as slow and dimwitted in the original specials, he quickly became one of the smartest characters on the series, and eventually opened the Blue Spruce Cafe as a bartender and assists with the Evergreen Standard's technical needs.
 Broo (voiced by Sharon Lewis) – a sheepdog puppy who seems to favour Bert as his owner in season 2 after the human characters were dropped from the show.
 Sophia Tutu (voiced by Sharon Lewis) – Cedric's ditzy girlfriend, who is a superb swan glider and diver. Although clearly an aardvark, she is much more human-shaped than either Cedric or Cyril. She is very feminine, but likes to ride bikes with Cedric and once participated in the Evergreen Games, coming in third place. She was phased out of the show in later years.
 Cyril Sneer (voiced by Michael Magee) – originally the main villain of the series, Cyril is an aardvark, with a long, pink nose, a ruthless and greedy businessman and Cedric's father. Although Cyril starts off villainous, he later softens up, becoming distinctly less so as the series progresses, though he retains his treacherous, greedy nature. Despite his money-grubbing ways, he has shown to genuinely love his son and tries grooming him to take over the family business. He has a soft spot for Bentley and Lisa, Ralph's nephew and niece. He has a strict matter of pride about keeping promises, as shown in "Going it Alone!" and "Trouble Shooter!".
 Snag (voiced by Michael Magee) – Cyril and Cedric Sneer's (non-anthropomorphic) pet dog. He has blue fur, a nose similar to his aardvark-owners' and a bad temper that rivals Cyril's, but he also loves Cedric and once saved him from a fire.
 The Pigs (voiced by Nick Nichols (Pig One (special 3-episode 50; 58)), Keith Hampshire (Pig One (episode 51–60)), Len Carlson (Pigs Two and Three (series)) and Fred Little (Pig Three (special 3) – Cyril's three bumbling henchmen and assistants. They are almost never referred to by name, as they are simply listed as Pig One, Two and Three in the credits, although they occasionally refer to one another as "Lloyd". Fans of the show have referred Pig One as "Lloyd" and the other two as "Boyd" and "Floyd". Kevin Gillis said their names were "Lloyd, Lloyd and their somewhat gullible brother, Floyd".
 The Bears (voiced by Len Carlson, Bob Dermer and Carl Banas) are Cyril Sneer's additional henchmen, workers, butlers, soldiers, spies, etc.
 Bentley Raccoon (voiced by Noam Zylberman (episode 16–54) and Stuart Stone (as Stu Stone) (episode 55–60) – George and Nicole's son. He's an expert with computers, and is a very typical younger kid, with a tendency to overemphasize his personal setbacks. He often favours houseguest Bert while Cyril Sneer thinks highly of him. He is originally introduced as Ralph's cousin in his first appearance but later retconned into his nephew.
 Lisa Raccoon (voiced by Lisa Lougheed) – Ralph's niece and Bentley's teenage basketball-playing sister, who becomes a prominent character in Season 5, after her first appearance in the Season 4 episode "Spring Fever", where she comes to visit. She is a caricature of her voice-actress; this would likely be similar to the narrators of many Rankin/Bass specials, usually being caricatures of their own celebrity voice actors.

Supporting
 Dan the Forest Ranger (voiced by Rupert Holmes (special 1), Leo Sayer (special 2), John Schneider (special 3), Kevin Gillis (special 4 (uncredited)) and Murray Crunchley (series) – he is the caretaker of the Evergreen Forest, as well as the father of Tommy and Julie and owner of Schaeffer and Broo during the specials and Season 1. He is shown to be a single father as there is no mention of the mother of his children in neither the specials nor the series.
 Tommy (voiced by Hadley Kay (specials) and Noam Zylberman (series)) – Ranger Dan's son and one of Schaeffer and Broo's original owners as well as Julie's little brother.
 Julie (voiced by Tammy Bourne (specials) and Vanessa Lindores (series) – Ranger Dan's daughter and one of Schaeffer and Broo's original owners as well as Tommy's older sister.
 Mr. Mammoth (voiced by Carl Banas) – a rhinoceros who is the richest, most powerful character on the show, he speaks in incoherent mumbles that are translated by his assistant
 Sidekick (voiced by Rick Jones, Seasons 1–2) and Dan Hennessey (Season 5) – Mr. Mammoth's canary assistant who translates his grumbles.
 Mr. Knox (voiced by Len Carlson) – an acquaintance of Cyril Sneer, a southern crocodile/business mogul; he is married to Lady Baden-Baden, and owner of the television company K.N.O.X. TV. He and Cyril are rivals, though it is a friendly one.
 Lady Baden-Baden (voiced by Bob Dermer) – a wealthy, melodramatic hen who eventually marries Mr. Knox. She was a theatre actress in her younger days, and now is an enthusiastic patron of the arts. She later becomes mayor of the Evergreen Forest.
 Professor Witherspoon Smedley-Smythe (voiced by Len Carlson) – a goat who runs the Evergreen Museum.
 Dr. Canard (voiced by Len Carlson) – a duck who is Cyril's doctor.
 Mr. Willow (voiced by Carl Banas) – a friendly polar bear who is the owner of Willow's General Store.
 Mrs. Suey-Ellen Pig (voiced by Nonnie Griffin) – the pigs' mother. She appears in two episodes, "Mom's the Word", where her name is revealed, and "Promises Promises".
 Milton Midas (voiced by Len Carlson) – an eagle businessman and scam artist. He is responsible for the poisoning of the fishing hole at Rippling Pond in the series' penultimate episode "The One that Got Away".
 George and Nicole Raccoon (voiced by Dan Hennessey and Elizabeth Hanna) – Ralph's respective older brother and sister-in-law and the father and mother of Bentley and Lisa Raccoon. A couple who were once nomads. George hosts "Chef Surprise", a cooking show on KNOX-TV.

Cast and characters

Main
 Len Carlson – Bert Raccoon / Floyd (Pig Two) / Lloyd (Pig Three) / Mr. Knox / Additional Voices
 Michael Magee – Cyril Sneer / Snag
 Bob Dermer – Ralph Raccoon / Lady Baden-Baden / Additional Voices
 Linda Feige – Melissa Raccoon (1985–1986)
 Susan Roman – Melissa Raccoon (1987–1991) / Additional Voices
 Marvin Goldhar – Cedric Sneer / Additional Voices
 Sharon Lewis – Sophia Tutu / Broo
 Carl Banas – Schaeffer / Bears / Mr. Mammoth / Mr. Willow
 Nick Nichols – Lloyd (Pig One) (1983–1990; 1991)
 Keith Hampshire – Lloyd (Pig One) (1990–1991)
 Murray Cruchley – Dan the Forest Ranger
 Noam Zylberman – Tommy / Bentley Raccoon (1987–1990)
 Stuart Stone – Bentley Raccoon (1990–1991) / Danny
 Vanessa Lindores – Julie
 Dan Hennessey – George Raccoon / Sidekick (1990)
 Elizabeth Hanna – Nicole Raccoon
 Lisa Lougheed – Lisa Raccoon
 Geoffrey Winter – Narrator

Additional voices
 Debra McGrath – Nurse Peck
 Les Lye – Samaritan "Sammy" Sneer
 Rick Jones – Sidekick (1985–1987)
 Derek Diorio – Haggis Lamborgini
 Pauline Rennie – Aunt Gertie
 Nonnie Griffin – Mrs. Suey-Ellen Pig
 Bob Segarini – Woodchuck Berry
 Barry Bailey – Troy Malone
 Jeremiah McCann – Bonneville Knox
 Peter Messaline – The Great Tromboni
 Kay Hawtrey – Miss Primrose
 Bruno Gerussi – Edward Miller
 Barbara Frum – Miss Barbara LaFrum
 Theresa Sears – Ingrid Bellamour
 Terrence Scammell – Classmate #1
 Tara Charendoff – Donna
 Lisa Yamanaka - Patty

Production
The Raccoons franchise was originally conceived by Kevin Gillis in the 1970s, while appearing in shows like Celebrity Cooks and Yes You Can. The initial idea for the show was created by Gillis and columnist Gary Dunford. They drew their inspiration for Ralph Raccoon from a dilemma that happened at a cottage in Ottawa. Dunford backed out, but Gillis took his idea to Ottawa lawyer Sheldon S. Wiseman, who saw a potential in Gillis' idea and put together a large group – animators, musicians, and writers, to create the first special to star the characters known as The Christmas Raccoons. Production on the special began in 1979 and was completed in 1980, and the special was shown on the December of the same year on CBC Television. It was also shown in countries around the world, including the U.S. and the United Kingdom. The special was a huge hit and resulted in two sequel specials The Raccoons on Ice and The Raccoons and the Lost Star and a direct-to-video special, The Raccoons: Let's Dance!. In 1981, US television networks CBS, NBC and ABC approached Sheldon Wiseman about producing a 13-episode "Raccoons" television series. In 1984, the Canadian Broadcasting Corporation and the Disney Channel began funding on the television series, which cost about $4.5 million to make. In the U.S., the show was run on The Disney Channel from July 4, 1985 until August 28, 1992. In Canada, it was shown on CBC on Monday evenings for the first season and was shown in a block consisting of The Wonderful World of Disney and Fraggle Rock on Sundays for the next two seasons before moving to Wednesdays in its fourth, sharing an hour block with The Beachcombers and then eventually Tuesdays in its fifth and final season.

Music
The series had a new wave soundtrack including the theme song "Run with Us" by cast member Lisa Lougheed. Season 1 ended with a different version of the song, not sung by Lougheed. "Run with Us" was performed in season 1 by Stephen Lunt. In the first season, Canadian singer Luba performed several songs, several of which were later re-recorded by Lougheed for use in other seasons. There were also several other songs performed by other musicians such as Rita Coolidge and Rupert Holmes who performed songs for the first special, Leo Sayer and Coolidge again for the second, and John Schneider and Dottie West for the last television special. Three of the songs had replaced Schneider's vocals with Frank Floyd and Hank Martin. Rory Dodd, The Dior Bros. (actually Kevin Gillis and Jon Stroll under a pseudonym), and several other musicians also had songs performed, although somewhat rarely compared to the aforementioned people. According to Jon Stroll, Frank Floyd, the frontman of the 1970s R&B funk group The Writers, was originally selected to be the main male singer for the series. Instead, as backup singer Valerie Wilson suggested, they replaced Floyd at the last minute with Curtis King Jr.

The earlier version of "Run with Us", like quite a few of the other songs from The Raccoons, were never officially released. The songs from the first two specials were released on the album Lake Freeze – The Raccoons Songtrack in 1983. A soundtrack for the fourth special was released in 1984, but featured vocals from Frank Floyd and Hank Martin to replace John Schneider. Nine of the songs from the series featured on Lougheed's album Evergreen Nights (1987), though Lougheed only sang some of the songs (sometimes in duets), while some were sung by other artists (Curtis King Jr. and Stephen Lunt). The French version of "Run with Us", as well as most of Luba and Lisa Lougheed's songs, was performed by the Quebecois Canadian singer Jano Bergeron with "Run with Us" being renamed in French to "Viens Vers Nous".

The instrumental music was composed by Kevin Gillis and Jon Stroll and performed largely by the National Arts Centre Orchestra from Ottawa, Canada. Most of the instrumental cues heard in the series were actually recorded for The Raccoons and the Lost Star and re-used. Only six of the instrumental tunes (two from The Raccoons on Ice and four from The Raccoons and the Lost Star) have ever been released officially (they can be found on the Lake Freeze and Let's Dance! albums).

Animation
From 1979 until 1985, Canadian animation studio Atkinson Film-Arts provided the animation for the four specials and first season of the series. In 1986, after producing the first 11 episodes, Hinton Animation Studios took over to animate the remaining seasons of the show (seasons 2–5).

Telecast and home media
The Raccoons that ran on CBC from November 11, 1985 until March 19, 1991 in Canada. It was also shown in countries around the world, including the U.S. and the United Kingdom. In the US, the show ran on The Disney Channel from July 4, 1985 until August 28, 1992. In Canada, it was shown on CBC on Monday evenings for the first season and was shown in a block consisting of The Wonderful World of Disney and Fraggle Rock on Sundays for the next two seasons before moving to Wednesdays in its fourth, sharing an hour block with The Beachcombers and then eventually Tuesdays in its fifth and final season. In the late 1990s, Trio, a US cable network then partially owned by the CBC, aired repeats of the show.

Embassy Home Entertainment released the specials and Season 1 on home video from 1982 to 1987. Embassy also released the specials on Laserdisc, CED and Betamax formats. Other distributors, such as Catalyst and GoodTimes Home Entertainment released some specials and episodes on VHS.

In the UK, Embassy Home Entertainment released the four Raccoons specials on VHS in the mid-1980s, before the distribution rights went to Channel 5 Video (a division of Polygram Video) in 1986. They re-released the four specials on video, as well as released another video called The Raccoons Big Surprise with two Season 1 episodes "Surprise Attack" and "Going It Alone" (Cat. No. CFV 05042). Then three videos with Season 2 episodes were released, the first two were by Picture Music International (PMI) that included "Double Play" and "The Sweet Smell of Success" on volume 1, released in 1988 and then "Blast from the Past" and "Power Trip" on volume 2, released in 1989. Then Video Collection International Ltd released a third tape which contained the episodes "Stop The Clock" and "The Artful Dodger" on 13 August 1990 (Cat No. VC1191). That same tape was re-released again by Video Collection International Ltd on 22 July 1991, as part of their Children's Club range (Cat No. KK0019).

In 2003, Morningstar Entertainment released the show on DVD for the first time. Two 9-episode boxsets were released, each containing 3 discs that were also available separately. The discs were released without any region coding in NTSC format. The first set contained nine of the ten episodes from season 2 (omitting "Stop the Clock") and the second set contained the first nine episodes of season 3. The extras include character bios, a chance to create your own scene from The Raccoons and Raccoon-A-Roma DVD-ROM content, like QuickTime animated sequences. For this release, Len Carlson also reprised his role as Bert during menus and gave in-character commentary before and after episodes. Both sets are now out of print, and no North American DVD release has come out since then.

A 2-disc Region 2 PAL DVD release of the complete series 1 was released on September 17, 2007 through Fabulous Films Ltd. The bonus features on set 1 were duplicated from the Canadian release, mainly the create a scene and Raccoon-A-Roma DVD ROM content. They later released a DVD entitled "Three Adventures With The Raccoons" on April 7, 2008. This DVD contained the first 3 episodes of Series 1 with no extras. Series 2 was released on April 20, 2009 by Fabulous Films Ltd. in another 2-disc set. DVD extras on the set include character model sheets and a documentary.

In September 2009, MORE Entertainment released an 8-disc DVD set in Germany, containing all 60 episodes (7–8 per disc) and no extras. The language track is German only. Later in November 2013, MORE released a DVD featuring all four Raccoons specials. As with previous complete series set, the only language track is German.

In December 2009, the first season of The Raccoons is released on iTunes in Canada. It was also released on iTunes in the United States in April 2010. The first two seasons were released on DVD to Netflix in the United States in early-2010 and in Canada on August 2011.

As of June 2020, the full-episode series is now available on YouTube.

Reception
The Raccoons was well received by critics. The New York Times, in its review for their second TV special, said "the Raccoons are an adorable lot, supported nicely by an attractive production." Variety praised the third special, The Raccoons and the Lost Star, calling it "a rollicking good adventure filled with space-age animation, high-tech gadgetry, lilting tunes, a lovable sheepdog, and the delightful Raccoons team."

The show was nominated for many awards, including a Gemini Award for Best Sound and Best Writing, and won the Gemini for Best Animated Series.

Legacy
In 1990, Bert and Lisa were named the mascots of the Canadian Olympic team. However, there were no Olympic Games that year.

In January 2022, the show was featured in the premiere episode of Son of a Critch.

Revival
In 2017, series creator Kevin Gillis was working on a revival of the series. A pitch pilot with slightly redesigned characters was found on YouTube as an unlisted video on March 11, 2018, but the video was soon taken down by Big Jump Entertainment due to a copyright claim. On June 17 of the same year, Big Jump officially revealed the new designs for Bert, Ralph, Melissa, Cyril and Cedric on their website. The reboot is scheduled to premiere in the near future, beginning with a holiday special entitled "When Raccoons Fly!". An official Instagram account for the franchise was created in August 2021.

Notes

References

External links

 
 The Unofficial Raccoons Home Page
 The Raccoons page on Big Jump Entertainment
 The Raccoons Official Instagram page

1980s Canadian animated television series
1980s Canadian children's television series
1985 Canadian television series debuts
1990s Canadian animated television series
1990s Canadian children's television series
1992 Canadian television series endings
Animated television series about mammals
Australian Broadcasting Corporation original programming
BBC children's television shows
Canadian children's animated comedy television series
Canadian children's animated drama television series
CBC Television original programming
Television series about raccoons
Television shows set in Canada